Amarkantak Thermal Power Plant is located in Chachai, near Amlai railway station on Bilaspur-Katni section of SE Railway. It is situated at Anuppur district of Madhya Pradesh, India. The power plant is one of the Coal-fired power station of MPPGCL

Power plant
Amarkantak Thermal Power Station has an installed capacity of 210.00 MW. The first unit was commissioned in March 1977.
The water for the plant has been procured from the nearby Sutna Nala Dam which is constructed on the Sone river and spread across .
The coal for the plant has been procured by rail from the mines of South Eastern Coalfields Limited

Installed capacity

See also 

 Satpura Thermal Power Station
 Sanjay Gandhi Thermal Power Station Pradesh
 Shree Singaji Thermal Power Project
 Anuppur Thermal Power Project

References 

Coal-fired power stations in Madhya Pradesh
Anuppur district
1977 establishments in Madhya Pradesh
Energy infrastructure completed in 1977
20th-century architecture in India